Gabriel Marinescu (first name also Gavril or Gavrilă; November 7, 1886 – November 26/27, 1940) was a Romanian general.

Born in Tigveni, Argeș County, he was the son of a teacher. He attended Saint Sava National College in Bucharest, the school for soldiers’ sons in Iași and the Bucharest military school, from which he graduated in 1907 as head of his class, with the rank of second lieutenant. After being promoted to lieutenant (1910) and then captain (1915), Marinescu served during the Romanian Campaign of World War I in a Vânători regiment. Promoted to major in April 1917, he distinguished himself in the Battle of Mărăști. For his valor displayed at engagements at Topești and Bârsești in the Putna River valley, on 11 August 1917 he was awarded the Order of Michael the Brave, 3rd class. In 1918 he became commanding officer of the 9th Mountain Troops Regiment. After the war, he joined the staff of the rural gendarmerie, becoming lieutenant colonel in 1921 and colonel in 1926.

In June 1930, soon after assuming the throne, King Carol II dismissed Bucharest's incumbent prefect of police, naming Marinescu, who held the office until November 1939. The deed was accomplished by royal decree without cabinet approval, signaling Carol's authoritarian tendencies. Marinescu thus became a founding member of the royal camarilla. As part of his duties, the general selected prostitutes appealing to the king. In 1934, Carol considered him to be his "personal guard", and a year later he told Nicolae Lupu that Marinescu was "the only man I trust".

In 1935, the building of a new police headquarters began; it was completed two years later. This was initiated by Marinescu and financed by Max Auschnitt. The same year, Marinescu co-authored a hagiographic volume on the king, and delivered a radio address attacking his opponent Iuliu Maniu. In February 1937, he was named state secretary at the Interior Ministry. As such, he took a number of harsh but unsuccessful measures against the Iron Guard, which in 1936 had already marked him for execution. On 10 May 1937 he was promoted to brigadier general.

In January 1938, shortly before the National Renaissance Front regime was established, Marinescu returned to his Interior position. Following the assassination of Prime Minister Armand Călinescu, he was named Interior Minister. During the week he served (21–28 September 1939), his agents killed some 250 Guard members in reprisal. He was then named head of a new Public Order Ministry, where he was responsible for the police and gendarmerie. This was dissolved on October 3. In November, Marinescu was dismissed as prefect of police.

In October 1940, during the National Legionary State, Marinescu was arrested. He was assassinated the next month as part of the Jilava massacre. He is buried at Bellu Cemetery in Bucharest.

Notes

References
Constantin Grigore and Miliana Șerbu, Miniștrii de interne (1862–2007). Editura Ministerului Internelor și Reformei Administrative, Bucharest, 2007.

External links
 

1886 births
1940 deaths
People from Argeș County
Romanian Land Forces generals
Romanian police chiefs
Romanian military personnel of World War I
Romanian Ministers of Interior
Camarilla (Carol II of Romania)
Romanian people who died in prison custody
Prisoners who died in Romanian detention
People assassinated by the Romanian Iron Guard
Prisoners murdered in custody
People murdered in Romania
Presidents of the Romanian Football Federation
Romanian sports executives and administrators
Saint Sava National College alumni
Recipients of the Order of Michael the Brave
Burials at Bellu Cemetery